The water polo competitions at the 2017 Southeast Asian Games in Bukit Jalil, Kuala Lumpur took place at National Aquatic Centre. It was one of four aquatic sports at the Games, along with diving, swimming, and synchronised swimming.

The 2017 Games featured competitions in two events.

Competition schedule
The following was the competition schedule for the water polo competitions:

Participation

Men's tournament

Women's tournament

Men's competition

Women's competition

Medal summary

Medal table

Medalists

References

External links
  

 
2017 Southeast Asian Games